Helligvær Church is a chapel of the Church of Norway in Bodø Municipality in Nordland county, Norway. It is located on the small island of Store Sørøya in the Helligvær islands in the Vestfjorden west of the town of Bodø. It is an annex chapel for the Bodin parish which is part of the Bodø domprosti (deanery) in the Diocese of Sør-Hålogaland. The small, white, wooden chapel was built in a long church style in 1899. The chapel seats about 100 people. It was originally a small bedehus (meeting house), but in 1908 it was consecrated as an official chapel.

See also
List of churches in Sør-Hålogaland

References

Churches in Bodø
Churches in Nordland
Wooden churches in Norway
19th-century Church of Norway church buildings
Churches completed in 1899
1899 establishments in Norway
Long churches in Norway